Stand for Children is an American education advocacy group. Founded in 1996 following a Children's Defense Fund rally the non-profit advocates for equity in public education. Stand for Children's mission is "to ensure all students receive a high quality, relevant education, especially those whose boundless potential is overlooked and under-tapped because of their skin color, zip code, first language, or disability."

Over the years, the organization has shifted its focus from children's issues to improving public education funding, and from funding to improving the public education system. The organization includes both a 501(c)(4) advocacy organization called Stand for Children, as well as a 501(c)(3) training organization called Stand for Children Leadership Center.

History
On June 1, 1996, over 300,000 people rallied in Washington, D.C. for "Stand for Children Day" at the Lincoln Memorial. This event was the largest demonstration in support of children in U.S. history. Rosa Parks, civil rights movement icon, made a statement that challenged the people of nation to commit themselves to improving the lives of children, saying, "If I can sit down for justice, you can stand up for children." Two days later, Time featured a cover with the headline, "Who Speaks for Kids?," and an interview with long-time children's activist Marian Wright Edelman, the mother of Stand for Children's CEO and co-founder, Jonah Edelman.

Following their work at the rally, Jonah Edelman and Eliza Leighton founded Stand for Children, seeking to pursue ongoing advocacy for the nation's children. The organization backed hundreds of rallies nationwide over the next two years, before moving toward more systemic changes. Today, Jonah Edelman is the CEO of Stand for Children, and Eliza Leighton is a member of the Board of Directors of Stand for Children Leadership Center.

Stand for Children opened a series of offices around the United States that had a local focus. Over time, Stand began focusing on statewide issues—particularly public education funding, which seemed of highest concern to parents and other community members.

Affiliate offices
Currently, Stand for Children has nine state affiliates: Arizona, Colorado, Illinois, Indiana, Louisiana, Oregon, Tennessee, Texas and Washington. The affiliates are supported by the national office in Portland, Oregon. While Stand for Children and Stand for Children Leadership Center are jointly led by CEO Jonah Edelman, they have distinct goals and methods of execution aligned with the sections of the federal tax code under which they are each described. Stand for Children, which is described under section 501(c)(4) is the grassroots advocacy group that works to mobilize concerned citizen activists at the local and state level to convince elected officials and voters to pass education reforms.  Stand for Children Leadership Center is a section 501(c)(3) organization that trains people to be effective citizen leaders capable of solving problems facing children, both locally and statewide.

In 2011, Stand for Children was praised in Time for "delivering results and changing how politicians think about grassroots education reform." The praise was attributed to the group's work to improve school funding in Oregon, teacher evaluations in Colorado, and teacher policy in Illinois.

Impact 
In the 25 years since its founding, Stand has achieved numerous legislative victories for students and created programs aimed at boosting academic success and achieving educational equity. Stand helped secure the passage and full funding of Measure 98 in Oregon, which provides $303 million to enable the state's school districts to expand evidence-based dropout prevention strategies, career technical education pathways, college credit courses, and post-secondary counseling. In Washington, Stand helped pass the nation's first-ever statewide Advanced Placement course enrollment equity requirement. Stand also played a pivotal role in advocating for the passage of funding for full-day kindergarten in Colorado in 2019. In Arizona, Stand helped pass Proposition 208, a pathbreaking education funding measure that would raise $940 million per year to help address Arizona’s teacher shortage crisis, hire additional counselors, nurses, social workers and aides, and double the state’s investment in career and technical education courses.

In 2017, Stand developed the Center for High School Success, which partners with school districts in multiple Stand-affiliate states to provide educators with resources, training, and data needed to ensure more ninth grade students stay on track to graduation.

In February 2021, Stand launched the Center for Antiracist Education to help educators end racism where it either takes root or is vanquished: in our schools. The program works with educators across the nation to identify antiracist curriculum, build antiracist expertise, and demonstrate what works in antiracist teaching.

Criticism
Critics of the group assert that it represents business interests—major funders include the Walton Family and Bill & Melinda Gates Foundations. Education policy analyst Diane Ravitch criticized the group for opposing teacher's unions and seeking to impose standardized testing on public schools. Susan Barrett, former volunteer co-leader of a Stand for Children team in Portland, Oregon, left the organization due to concerns that corporate donors and wealthy board members influence reforms. In 2009, Stand for Children volunteers in Massachusetts witnessed an organizational change in favor of promoting charter schools. The former volunteers organized to protest a ballot initiative filed by Stand for Children. Former Stand for Children volunteers said the ballot measure puts the careers of teachers at the mercy of a rating system while doing nothing to improve teaching in schools.

Regarding Stand For Children's success in Illinois, Edelman stated: "They essentially gave away every single provision related to teacher effectiveness that we had proposed — everything we had fought for in Colorado. We hired 11 lobbyists, including four of the absolute best insiders and seven of the best minority lobbyists, preventing the unions from hiring them."  He further stated, "There was a palpable sense of concern if not shock on the part of the teachers' unions of Illinois that Speaker [of the House Mike] Madigan had changed allegiance and that we had clear political capability to potentially jam this proposal down their throats the same way that pension reform had been jammed down their throats six months earlier."
The Chicago Tribune called Stand for Children "a new force in Illinois politics." In all, two Chicago newspapers published editorials in favor of Performance Counts.

Some journalists questioned the $2.9 million raised by Stand for Children's Illinois PAC due to the affiliate's recent formation and fundraising in the months before a new Illinois law capped campaign contributions for individuals and corporations. These funds, donated by a small number of businesspeople giving hundreds of thousands of dollars each, led detractors question the organization's grassroots support in the state.

See also
Geoffrey Canada

References

External links
Stand For Children (official website)

Non-profit organizations based in Oregon
Children's rights organizations in the United States
Organizations based in Portland, Oregon